Afsan Chowdhury (born 16 February 1952) is a Bangladeshi liberation war researcher, columnist and journalist. He received Bangla Academy Award in the year 2018 for his contribution to the liberation war literature.

Early life
Chowdhury was born on 16 February 1952 in Dhaka. After completing his higher education from the Department of History in Dhaka University, he started his career in journalism. During his career as a journalist, he served as an editor for Dhaka Courier, contributed to The Daily Star and also produced a number of BBC World Service series. He was also one of the founder Promoter of United News of Bangladesh, one of the country's leading news agencies. He is a teacher of BRAC University and runs the Diversity Studies Cluster there.

References

1952 births
Bangladeshi male writers
Recipients of Bangla Academy Award
Living people